Sabah Sarawak Keluar Malaysia (SSKM) (English: Sabah Sarawak Leaves Malaysia) is a separatist organisation that intends to separate the states of Sabah and Sarawak from the Federation of Malaysia.

See also
 Separatist movements of Malaysia
 Separation of Singapore from Malaysia
 Proposed 2019 amendment to the Constitution of Malaysia
 North Borneo dispute

References

External links
 
 

Separatism in Malaysia
Politics of Sabah
Politics of Sarawak